Radical right may refer to one of the following topics:

 Radical right (United States), a strictly conservative and anti-socialist tendency in US politics
 Radical right (Europe), a nationalist and populist tendency in European politics
 Radical right (Germany), proposed by German political scientists as differing from the extreme right
 Far-right politics, sometimes used interchangeably with "radical right"

See also
 Radical center (disambiguation)
 Radical left (disambiguation)